"Legal Man" is the debut single of Scottish indie pop band Belle and Sebastian. The track features Isobel Campbell, Sarah Martin, and Rozanne Suarez (credited as the Maisonettes) on vocals and Snow Patrol drummer Jonny Quinn on congas. The cover artwork—designed by Andrew Symington—features band members Stevie Jackson and Campbell along with Adrienne Payne and Suarez. Two B-sides were released with the single: "Judy Is a Dick Slap", an instrumental, and "Winter Wooskie", which was the last time bass player Stuart David sang lead vocals before departing the band in 2000.

"Legal Man" was released in May 2000, first in the United States on 16 May, then in the United Kingdom six days later. It reached number 15 on the UK Singles Chart, number 10 in Norway, number 46 in Sweden, and number 50 in Ireland. In Canada, the track reached number four on Nielsen SoundScan's Canadian Singles Chart. The song's music video was directed by Campbell.

B-sides
"Judy Is a Dick Slap" is the first instrumental released by the band while "Winter Wooskie" is the third and final song featuring lead vocals from former bass player Stuart David, who left the band in 2000. All three tracks from the single were later collected on the Push Barman to Open Old Wounds compilation.

Track listings
All songs were written by Belle and Sebastian.

CD single
 "Legal Man"
 "Judy Is a Dick Slap"
 "Winter Wooskie"

7-inch single
A. "Legal Man"
B. "Winter Wooskie"

12-inch single
A. "Legal Man"
B. "Judy Is a Dick Slap"

Credits and personnel
Credits are adapted from the UK 7-inch single sleeve and disc notes.

Studio
 Recorded at CaVa Studios (Glasgow, Scotland)

Personnel

 Belle and Sebastian – writing, production
 The Maisonettes – vocals
 Rozanne Suarez – vocals, cover star
 Jonny Quinn – congas
 Tony Doogan – production, recording
 Willie Deans – recording assistant

 Ian Grier – recording assistant
 Stevie Jackson – cover star
 Isobel Campbell – cover star
 Adrienne Payne – cover star
 Katrina House – back cover star
 Andrew Symington – cover design

Charts

Release history

References

External links
 "Legal Man" at belleandsebastian.com
 "Legal Man" at jeepster.co.uk

2000 debut singles
2000 songs
Belle and Sebastian songs
Jeepster Records singles
Matador Records singles